Leslie Greif (born July 30, 1954) is an American director, writer, and film and television producer.

Career
Greif began his career as an NBC Page out of NBC-Burbank.  He later was a producer with the television series Sins in 1986.

Greif's first film as a director was Keys to Tulsa in 1997.  The film was not well received by critics.

In 2007 he both wrote the screenplay and directed the comedy film 10 Rules for Sleeping Around.

Greif's works include Walker Texas Ranger, Gene Simmons Family Jewels, Hatfields & McCoys,  Brando, Funny Money, Mounted in Alaska, Meet Wally Sparks and Monday Night Mayhem. He has worked extensively in TV mini-series, reality television, full-length features and scripted television. Greif's production team includes Adam Reed, Adam Freeman, Herb Nanas, Joanne Rubino and Aaron Semmel at his production company ThinkFactory Media in Santa Monica. In 2012 Hatfields & McCoys, for which Greif was executive producer, won several Emmy Awards including Kevin Costner for best actor in a miniseries and Tom Berenger for best supporting actor.

References

External links 

Living people
American male screenwriters
American television writers
American television producers
American male television writers
American film directors
1954 births